Frank Molther (October 15, 1893 – October 25, 1956) was an American architect. His work was part of the architecture event in the art competition at the 1936 Summer Olympics.

References

1893 births
1956 deaths
20th-century American architects
Olympic competitors in art competitions
People from Syracuse, New York